Johannes van Damme (1 June 1935 – 23 September 1994) was a Dutch engineer and businessman executed in Singapore for drug trafficking. He was the first European to be executed in Singapore since its independence.

Biography 
Van Damme had been a resident of Nigeria since 1976 and was married to a Nigerian woman at the time of his arrest.

On 14 February 1991, he was sentenced in absentia to ten weeks in jail, however he did not serve any time in prison as he was in Nigeria when the judgement was handed down.

Background to arrest 
In the early 1990s, the US Drug Enforcement Administration set up the Kodiac car brokerage firm in Baltimore, Maryland, as a front company. As well as selling cars, the undercover DEA agents running the firm helped to transfer large amounts of money to foreign banks on behalf of local drug traffickers. The information gathered during these operations would then be used to help arrest drug offenders and used as evidence during their prosecution in court.

In October 1990, DEA agent Wilbert Lee Plummer (who was the undercover agent in charge of Kodiac) was introduced to a Washington D.C. based Nigerian national named Chidi Leon Eboh, who ran a drug smuggling network between Thailand and the United States. The syndicate would typically recruit African American couriers to travel to Singapore and await another drug mule to arrive from Bangkok with a shipment of heroin. After receiving the narcotics, the American courier would then travel onto Europe, and would be paid on average US$10,000 for smuggling 5 kilograms of heroin.

In March 1991, DEA agent Plummer transferred US$80,000 to a bank account in Bangkok for a 5 per cent commission fee on behalf of Leon, and would transfer cash on two further occasions to Bangkok based bank accounts in the course of his investigations. DEA agent Plummer also purchased 100 grams of heroin from Leon for US$18,000 to build confidence with and embed himself further within the drug trafficking organization.

On 13 August 1991, Leon asked DEA agent Plummer to send US$22,000 to a Singapore based Nigerian national named John Obeifuna, on the understanding the money was to be used to fund the purchase of heroin from Thailand. DEA agent Plummer informed Singapore based DEA agent Harry Fullett about the transaction, who then alerted the Central Narcotics Bureau. Discovering Obeifuna was staying at the Westin Stamford Hotel on Stamford Road, the CNB bugged his hotel room and put him under 24 hour surveillance. On 22 August 1991, DEA agent Plummer wired the US$22,000 to Obeifuna's bank account as requested, and Obeifuna then moved out of the hotel to a rented apartment on Oxley Road.

On the night of 20 September 1991, undercover CNB agents observed Obeifuna appearing on the balcony of his apartment several times, as if he was expecting someone to arrive. Soon after, the agents spotted a European man emerge from a taxi on the same road. Obeifuna exited his apartment and walked down the street, and appeared to bump into the man. They talked for a short time, and then the European walked away to return to the nearby Lloyd's Inn hotel where he was staying. Subsequent investigations by the CNB agents identified the man as Dutch national Johannes van Damme.

Obeifuna and Van Damme next met at a coffee shop, where undercover agents were waiting for them to arrive. A pair of agents disguised as American tourists sat beside the two men and started to record their surroundings on a video camera, thus capturing Obeifuna and Van Damme speaking to each other on tape. One of the "tourists" then asked the pair if they could keep an eye on his bag for a few minutes while he recorded some footage of the street outside. Unknown to Obeifuna and Van Damme, inside the bag was a hidden microphone and tape recorder, which captured their ensuing conversation where they discussed the details of their plan to have Van Damme travel first to Thailand then onwards to Europe for a payment of US$20,000.

Van Damme subsequently booked a short package holiday to Phuket, and on arrival took a separate flight to Bangkok to collect a suitcase from Obeifuna's contacts. After receiving it, Van Damme returned to Phuket on the same day and awaited his return flight to Singapore a few days later.

Arrest and trial 
Van Damme was arrested on the afternoon of 27 September 1991 in the transit lounge of Singapore Changi Airport, after arriving from Phuket and awaiting on a connecting flight to Athens in the evening. Alerted by a police sniffer dog, narcotics officers had found   of heroin in a secret compartment of a suitcase belonging to him in the baggage area. On 12 October 1991, Nigerian engineer John Obiefuna was arrested at his Oxley Garden apartment in connection with the heroin Van Damme was caught with. He was later charged with abetting Van Damme to import the heroin and was scheduled to face joint trial with him.

On 8 April 1993, the opening statement of Deputy Public Prosecutor Ismail Hamid described how officers, acting on information received, had kept Van Damme under surveillance after he arrived from Thailand that afternoon. He was trailed from the airport's interline transfer counter to the transit lounge, where he was then intercepted. Narcotics officers subsequently removed the lining of his suitcase and discovered two plastic bags containing a whiteish substance, which was later determined to be heroin. Both plastic bags were smeared with a dark paste that smelled of coffee. 

During the trial, Van Damme claimed he first met Obiefuna in a Singapore hotel in July 1991 and again in September 1991. At this second meeting Van Damme mentioned he was going to Bangkok to met fabric wholesalers. Obiefuna asked him to pick up a suitcase containing clothing while there, and bring it to Athens where someone would collect it on his behalf. When Van Damme collected the suitcase it was empty, so he transferred the contents of his travel bag into it as he wanted it for his own use. Although he did wonder at the time if he had been given the wrong suitcase, Van Damme testified that he planned to contact Obiefuna to clarify the issue. He only realized it contained drugs after officers forced it open in the Central Narcotics Bureau office in Changi Airport and showed him the two packets of heroin concealed in the false bottom of the suitcase.

Van Damme also challenged the admissibility of a statement he gave to Central Narcotics Bureau Inspector William Chew Khai Chow over 5 days between 30 September 1991 and 25 October 1991, where he said he knew about the drugs in the suitcase and that he would be paid US$20,000 to bring them to Athens. Van Damme claimed he was told that the officers were not interested in him but in the syndicate the drugs belonged to, and that he hoped he "could go home after I helped them with the statement". Van Damme testified to the court that the US$20,000 he was to be paid in Athens was offered by Obiefuna because he wanted to be on the board of directors of a company he was going to set up in Holland, and was not a payment for transporting illegal drugs. On 19 April 1993, Justice S. Rajendran ruled Van Damme's version of events regarding the recording of his original statement was probable and this would have amounted to inducement, thereby rendering the entire statement recorded by the Central Narcotics Bureau inadmissible.

On 20 April 1993, Justice S. Rajendran ruled Obiefuna had no case to answer and acquitted him of all charges, citing lack of evidence to warrant a conviction. According to the prosecution, Central Narcotics Bureau officers originally had Obiefuna under surveillance for a number of months, as they suspected him of traveling to Singapore to recruit drug couriers on behalf of an international narcotics syndicate  and subsequently observed him talking to Van Damme for about 5 minutes outside his Oxley Garden apartment on 20 September 1991. Apart from this, a piece of paper sized from Van Damme with a name and telephone number written on it, allegedly by Obiefuna, was submitted as evidence. However a Department of Scientific Services officer testified there was insufficient similarities between it and samples of Obiefuna's handwriting for a positive identification to be made.

On 21 April 1993, Van Damme was questioned by Deputy Public Prosecutor Ismail Hamid about trips he made between July 1991 and September 1991. He traveled from Singapore to Bangkok then Vienna via Singapore onto Zurich between 17 July and 11 August, then on 21 August he returned to Singapore before repeating the Bangkok to Zurich via Singapore trip again. Despite claiming he  visited Singapore to source suppliers for a proposed communication center in Lagos, meet fabric wholesalers in Bangkok, and went to Vienna to shop for lace for his daughters wedding dress, Van Damme could not provide any documentary evidence to support his claims. When asked to produce corroborating evidence such as contracts, sales receipts or business cards, Van Damme stated "I never keep anything. When I've read a letter, I always throw it away". The pattern of his travels were used to help back up the prosecutions assertions that Van Damme was in fact a drug mule who was fully aware of the contents of the suitcase seized at Changi Airport, and had agreed to carry the heroin from Bangkok to Athens via Singapore for a payment of US$20,000

Verdict 

On 26 April 1993, Van Damme was found guilty as charged and sentenced to death for importing 4.32 kilograms of pure heroin into Singapore, contrary to Section 7 of the Misuse of Drugs Act. Justice S. Rajendran told Van Damme in his oral judgement "I have no doubt in my mind that you knew that there was a controlled drug concealed in the bag". The judge found many parts of Van Damme's testimony "quite unsatisfactory", such as:
 Van Damme made three trips to Bangkok via Singapore from European cities between 17 July 1991 and 16 September 1991, for which he could not produce documentary evidence to adequately explain his innocent reasons for doing so 
 Van Damme asked for and received US$4,300 from Obiefuna for expenses, despite no agreement being in place regarding Obiefuna joining the future company Van Damme would set up in Holland 
 Van Damme's suspicion was not aroused by the unusually heavy weight of the empty suitcase he received in Bangkok

Appeals 
On 23 November 1993, the Court of Appeal rejected Van Damme's appeal against his conviction, ruling the trial judge was correct in rejecting his defence that he was tricked by Obiefuna into carrying the heroin into Singapore in the false bottom of a suitcase. Defence lawyer Edmond Pereira had also argued that Van Damme was infact not in possession of the drugs, as the suitcase was under the control of the airline at all times until he arrived in Singapore, however this was dismissed by the appeal judges.   

On 6 May 1994, Van Damme petitioned President Ong Teng Cheong for clemency. Acting on the advice of the Cabinet, the President turned down the petition on 7 July 1994.

A plea for clemency from the Dutch government was rejected by the president of Singapore, Ong Teng Cheong. A letter from Queen Beatrix of the Netherlands was also sent to the president in an unsuccessful attempt to prevent van Damme from being executed.

Execution 
Van Damme was hanged at Changi Prison on the morning of 23 September 1994. The Central Narcotics Bureau issued a press release at 11:30am stating: "A convicted drug smuggler, Johannes Van Damme , a man aged 59 and a Dutch national, was put to death in Changi Prison this morning."

Van Damme's family later released a copy of the telegram that they received from Singapore prison officials: "Death sentence passed on Johannes Van Damme will be carried into effect on 23.9.94. Visit him on 20.9.94. Claim body on 23.9.94. Signed Superintendent, Changi Prison, Singapore."

Singapore Foreign Minister S. Jayakumar responded to European calls for clemency by saying it was completely untenable to make an exception in executing Van Damme, as doing so would undermine the city state's reputation for integrity and impartial enforcement of its laws.

That same year, Mat Repin was also executed by hanging on 13 May 1994, for having smuggled  of cannabis from Malaysia.

See also 
 Capital punishment for drug trafficking
 Capital punishment in Singapore
 Disneyland with the Death Penalty

References 

20th-century Dutch criminals
20th-century executions by Singapore
1935 births
1991 crimes in Singapore
1994 deaths
Dutch drug traffickers
Dutch expatriates in Nigeria
Dutch expatriates in Singapore
Dutch people executed abroad
Executed Dutch people
People executed for drug offences
People from Middelburg, Zeeland